Triple Justice is a 1940 American Western film directed by David Howard and starring George O'Brien, Virginia Vale and Peggy Shannon. The supporting cast includes Paul Fix and Glenn Strange.

Plot

Cast
 George O'Brien as Brad Henderson
 Virginia Vale as Lorna Payson
 Peggy Shannon as Susan
 Harry Woods as Deputy Al Reeves
 Paul Fix as Fred Cleary
 LeRoy Mason as Sheriff Bill Gregory
 Glenn Strange as Frank Wiley
 Malcolm 'Bud' McTaggart as Tom Payson
 Robert McKenzie as Telegraph Operator
 Wilfred Lucas as Constable Herb a Tule Mesa
 The Lindeman Sisters as The Solas Sisters

Box office
According to the RKO records, the picture recorded a loss of $5,000.

References

External links
 Triple Justice at IMDb

1940 Western (genre) films
1940 films
RKO Pictures films
Films produced by Bert Gilroy
Films directed by David Howard
American Western (genre) films
American black-and-white films
1940s American films